German submarine U-336 was a Type VIIC U-boat of Nazi Germany's Kriegsmarine during World War II. The submarine was laid down on 28 March 1941 at the Nordseewerke yard at Emden as yard number 208, launched on 4 December and commissioned on 14 February 1942 under the command of Kapitänleutnant Hans Hunger.

Design
German Type VIIC submarines were preceded by the shorter Type VIIB submarines. U-336 had a displacement of  when at the surface and  while submerged. She had two shafts and two  propellers.

U-336 was fitted with five  torpedo tubes (four fitted at the bow and one at the stern), fourteen torpedoes, one  SK C/35 naval gun, 220 rounds, and a  C/30 anti-aircraft gun. The boat had a complement of between forty-four and sixty.

Service history
After training with the 5th U-boat Flotilla, she moved to the 1st flotilla for front-line service in December 1942.

The boat carried out five patrols, sinking one ship.

She was a member of ten wolfpacks.

First patrol
The boat's first patrol was very brief; starting and finishing in Kiel on 12 and 13 November 1942.

Second patrol
Her second foray also started in Kiel, but terminated in Brest in occupied France after passing between the Faroe and Shetland Islands. She sank the Belgian tanker President Francqui on 29 December 1942 north of the Azores. The ship had already been hit by two torpedoes. U-336 finished her off with a 'coup de grâce'.

Third patrol
The submarine's third sortie was again into the mid-Atlantic. She spent days scouring the empty wastes, but returned to Brest without success.

Fourth patrol
U-336 fourth patrol was, at 71 days, her longest. She was attacked by an unidentified aircraft on 10 July 1943 west of Lisbon. Slight damage was the result.

Fifth patrol
U-336 left Brest for the last time on 14 September 1943. Initially she headed west, out of the Bay of Biscay. On the 24th, she turned north.

Fate
On 5 October, she was sunk by rockets fired by a British Lockheed Hudson of No. 269 Squadron RAF in the Denmark Strait, (between Greenland and Iceland).

Fifty men died; there were no survivors.

Wolfpacks
U-336 took part in ten wolfpacks, namely:
 Ungestüm (11 – 30 December 1942) 
 Neuland (8 – 13 March 1943) 
 Dränger (14 – 20 March 1943) 
 Seewolf (21 – 30 March 1943) 
 Oder (17 – 19 May 1943) 
 Mosel (19 – 24 May 1943) 
 Trutz (1 – 16 June 1943) 
 Trutz 2 (16 – 29 June 1943) 
 Geier 3 (30 June – 10 July 1943) 
 Rossbach (24 September – 5 October 1943)

Summary of raiding history

References

Bibliography

External links
 

German Type VIIC submarines
U-boats commissioned in 1942
U-boats sunk in 1943
World War II submarines of Germany
World War II shipwrecks in the Atlantic Ocean
U-boats sunk by British aircraft
1942 ships
Ships built in Emden
Ships lost with all hands
Maritime incidents in December 1942